Nine Years of Blood is the eighth studio album by Irish Celtic metal band Cruachan. It was released in 2018 on Trollzorn Records.

Track listing

Personnel
Keith Fay - vocals, guitars, acoustic guitar, keyboards, tin whistle, bouzouki, mandolin, bodhrán, percussion
Kieran Ball - guitars, acoustic guitar
Erin Fletcher - bass guitar
Mauro Frison - drums, percussion
John Ryan - violin, cello, bowed bass

 Additional personnel
Daniel Durbeck - artwork, design and layout
Michael Richards - producer, recording

References

Cruachan (band) albums
2018 albums
Irish-language albums
Trollzorn Records albums